Safe in Sound may refer to:

Safe in Sound (Jim Boggia album) 
Safe in Sound (Lower Than Atlantis album)
"Safe in Sound", a song by Sub Focus from his 2013 album Torus
Safe-In-Sound Award